First produced in 1962, the Agfa Optima 1a or Agfamatic was one of the first fully automatic scale-focusing 35mm film cameras. The successor to German camera manufacturer Agfa's Optima 1 camera, the camera employed a selenium cell that generated a voltage related to the luminance, to both measure the light level and to provide the power required for automatic setting of aperture and shutter speed. Other features included a flash mode which overrode the automatic mode to set the camera shutter speed to 1/30s, and a bulb mode for long exposures.

References

External links
 Optima on Camera-wiki.org
 Agfa Optima 1a at Lomography, examples of photographs

135 film cameras
Agfa cameras
Products introduced in 1962